Per Lundell (born June 29, 1968 in Sweden) is a former professional Swedish ice hockey player.

Playing career
He played during his career for two teams in the Swedish Elite League, Leksands IF (1987–1991, 1999–2000 and 2003–2004) and Färjestads BK (1991–1996 and 2001–2003). He also played in several other European leagues, he played in the German Deutsche Eishockey Liga for Starbulls Rosenheim (1996–1997) and for Nürnberg Ice Tigers (1998–1999 and 2000–2001), he also played in Austria for Feldkirch during the 1997–1998 and he also has played in Norway for Stjernen during the 2004–2005 season. After his time with Stjernen did he play a couple of seasons in the lower leagues in Sweden.

Coaching career
Lundell started his coaching career as assistant coach for Skåre BK in 2005. After coaching in Sweden a couple of years, he was announced head coach for the Norwegian GET-league team Kongsvinger Knights before the 2015-16 season.

References

External links
Stats at EliteProspects.com

1968 births
Living people
Swedish ice hockey defencemen
Färjestad BK players
Leksands IF players
Nürnberg Ice Tigers players
Starbulls Rosenheim players
Stjernen Hockey players
VEU Feldkirch players